The Speedway Grand Prix of Slovenia was a speedway event that was a part of the Speedway Grand Prix Series. Initially staged between 2002 and 2009, and again in 2013, it returned to the calendar in 2015 before ending in 2019.

Winners

Most wins

 Tony Rickardsson &   Nicki Pedersen - 2 times

See also

 
Grand Prix
Krško
Slovenia
Recurring sporting events established in 2002
2002 establishments in Slovenia